Andrew Henderson (23 January 1922 – 18 August 2020) was a Scottish cricketer. He played in one first-class match for the Scotland cricket team, against Ireland, in 1953.

References

External links
 

1922 births
2020 deaths
Scottish cricketers
Cricketers from Selkirk, Scottish Borders